The canton of Ugine is an administrative division of the Savoie department, southeastern France. Its borders were modified at the French canton reorganisation which came into effect in March 2015. Its seat is in Ugine.

Composition

It consists of the following communes:

Beaufort
Césarches
Cohennoz
Crest-Voland
Flumet
La Giettaz
Hauteluce
Marthod
Notre-Dame-de-Bellecombe
Pallud
Queige
Saint-Nicolas-la-Chapelle
Thénésol
Ugine
Venthon
Villard-sur-Doron

Councillors

Pictures of the canton

References

Cantons of Savoie